Great Siege may refer to:

 Great Siege of Gibraltar, 1779–1783, an unsuccessful attempt by Spain and France to capture Gibraltar from Britain
 Great Siege of Malta, 1565, an unsuccessful attempt by the Ottoman Empire to capture Malta from the Order of Saint John
 Great Siege of Montevideo, 1843–1851, during the Uruguayan Civil War
 Great Siege of Scarborough Castle, 1645, during the English Civil War